The list of ship launches in 1970 includes a chronological list of ships launched in 1970.  In cases where no official launching ceremony was held, the date built or completed may be used instead. This list (as for those of other years) primarily covers Naval Vessels as, with rare exception, commercial ship launchings are too numerous to be listed.


References 

1970
 Ship launches
 Ship launches
Ship launches